Wyre was a parliamentary constituency in the Wyre district of Lancashire. It returned one Member of Parliament (MP)  to the House of Commons of the Parliament of the United Kingdom from 1983 until it was abolished for the 1997 general election. It was then partially replaced by the new constituency of Lancaster and Wyre.

Boundaries
The Borough of Wyre wards of Bailey, Bourne, Breck, Carleton, Cleveleys Park, Hambleton, Hardhorn, High Cross, Jubilee, Mount, Norcross, Park, Pharos, Preesall, Rossall, Staina, Tithebarn, Victoria, and Warren.

Members of Parliament

Elections

Elections in the 1980s

Elections in the 1990s

See also
List of parliamentary constituencies in Lancashire

Notes and references

Parliamentary constituencies in North West England (historic)
Constituencies of the Parliament of the United Kingdom established in 1983
Constituencies of the Parliament of the United Kingdom disestablished in 1997
Borough of Wyre